Mount Robson Provincial Park is a provincial park in the Canadian Rockies with an area of 2,249 km². The park is located entirely within British Columbia, bordering Jasper National Park in Alberta. The B.C. legislature created the park in 1913, the same year as the first ascent of Mount Robson by a party led by Conrad Kain. It is the second oldest park in the provincial system.  The park is named for Mount Robson, which has the highest point in the Canadian Rockies and is located entirely within the park.

History
The first recreational trail was built in 1913 by Jasper outfitter Donald "Curly" Phillips along the Robson River to Berg Lake.

From May to September, the Mt. Robson Visitor Information Centre is open to the public, and is a common stop on the Yellowhead Highway. The only commercial services within the park are at a combination coffee-shop gas station complex at the same viewpoint. There are two government campgrounds near the Visitor Centre and one near Yellowhead Pass.

Geography
The park spans the Yellowhead Highway and is located 390 kilometres west of Edmonton or 290 kilometres east of Prince George.

The source of the Fraser River is in Mount Robson Provincial Park. A dripping spring just west of a pond at Fraser Pass is the actual source of British Columbia's longest river. There are no trails there and the best access is by helicopter from Valemount.

Notable features
Notable natural features found in the park include:
Arctomys Cave
Berg Lake
Kinney Lake
Yellowhead Lake

World Heritage Site
In 1990 Mount Robson Park was included within the Canadian Rocky Mountain Parks UNESCO World Heritage Site.  Together with the other national and provincial parks that comprise the Canadian Rocky Mountain Parks, the park was recognized for its natural beauty and the geological and ecological significance of its mountain landscapes containing the habitats of rare and endangered species, mountain peaks, glaciers, lakes, waterfalls, canyons, limestone caves and fossils.

See also
List of British Columbia Provincial Parks
List of World Heritage Sites in Canada

References

Further reading 
 Adams, Ansel (2013). Ansel Adams In The Canadian Rockies. Little, Brown and Company.

External links

 
 

1913 establishments in British Columbia
Parks in the Canadian Rockies
Protected areas established in 1913
 
Robson Valley
Provincial and state parks in the Rocky Mountains